Turgoyak is a lake in Chelyabinsk Oblast, near the city of Miass, Russia. It has a surface of 2638 hectares. The water of the lake has a great transparency (from 10-17.5 m). The quality of the water is comparable to that of Lake Baikal.

A megalithic monument is found on an island in the lake (Vera island), as well as ruins of a monastery.

The lake is a popular tourist destination with resorts and holiday camps.

Gallery

External links
 Map 
 Lake Turgoyak Photographs

Turgoyak
Natural monuments of Russia